Rockville Centre Union Free School District is a school district headquartered in the William H. Johnson Administration Building on the campus of South Side High School in Rockville Centre, New York.

History
William H. Johnson began working for the district circa 1980, and he began his term as superintendent circa 1986. Johnson retired in 2020; accordingly the administration building gained its current name, derived from Johnson, in 2020.

Schools
 Secondary schools
 South Side High School
 South Side Middle School
 Elementary schools
 Covert Elementary School
 Hewitt Elementary School
 Riverside Elementary School
 Watson Elementary School
 Wilson Elementary School

References

External links
 Rockville Centre Union Free School District
School districts in New York (state)
Education in Nassau County, New York